The 1933–34 Polska Liga Hokejowa season was the seventh season of the Polska Liga Hokejowa, the top level of ice hockey in Poland. Four teams participated in the final round, and AZS Posen won the championship.

Qualification
 Lechia Lwów - KS Cracovia 2:1
 Czarni Lwów - KTH Krynica 5:2

Final Tournament

External links
 Season on hockeyarchives.info

Polska Hokej Liga seasons
Polska
1933–34 in Polish ice hockey